Jan Russell Schelhaas (born 11 March 1948) is an English musician, mostly known as the keyboard player from the bands Caravan and Camel.

Biography
Schelhaas was born in Liverpool, where he started his career playing bass for several bands and releasing a single on Decca's Deram label as the soul band Bernie & the Buzz Band in 1968 before finally turning to keyboards and starting the soft rock band, National Head Band, in 1970 with Neil Ford on guitar and future Uriah Heep's Lee Kerslake on drums. They released the album Albert One in 1971 produced by Yes producer Eddie Offord, but without any success. Next stop for Schelhaas was the Gary Moore band and the recording of the album Grinding Stone from 1973. After the recording, he left Moore to do solo projects including an organ session on Thin Lizzy's 1973 Vagabonds of the Western World album.

In July 1975, Schelhaas was asked to play keyboard in the band Caravan after Dave Sinclair left them. Jan Schelhaas toured the world around with the band and recorded three albums: Blind Dog at St. Dunstans (1976), Better by Far (1977) and Cool Water, which was not released until 1994. In 1978, Caravan had a break and Schelhaas accepted an offer to join Camel on their world tour for their album Breathless (1978). At that time, the band also included cousins Richard Sinclair (bass and vocals) and Dave Sinclair (keyboards) with whom he had already played in Caravan.

Schelhaas worked with Camel until 1981, when he contributed to I Can See Your House from Here from 1979 and the album Nude from 1981. From 1982 to 1989, he played on two of Lee Fardon's albums: The God Given Right and The Savage Art of Love and the EP Palestine. Schelhaas had met Fardon when they both played with Ross Stagg in the early 1970s.

In 2002, Schelhaas was once again asked to join Caravan due to Dave Sinclair having left because of musical differences. He recorded The Unauthorized Breakfast Item with them in the same year plus a tour. Although there was a hiatus in the band's activities from 2005-10 (during which he released his first solo album, Dark Ships, in 2008), Schelhaas remains a member of Caravan and appears on their latest albums, 2013's Paradise Filter and 2021's ''It’s None of Your Business'.

References

External links
 Jan Schelhaas' credits on different albums at Discogs.com

1948 births
Living people
English keyboardists
Musicians from Liverpool
Caravan (band) members
The Gary Moore Band members
Camel (band) members
Progressive rock keyboardists